Theridion varians is a species of cobweb spider in the family Theridiidae. It is found in North America, Europe, North Africa, Turkey, Caucasus, a range from Russia (Europe to Siberia), Central Asia, and China.

Subspecies
These four subspecies belong to the species Theridion varians:
 (Theridion varians melanotum) Strand, 1907
 (Theridion varians varians) Hahn, 1833
 Theridion varians cyrenaicum Caporiacco, 1933
 Theridion varians rusticum Simon, 1873

References

External links

 

Theridiidae
Articles created by Qbugbot
Spiders described in 1833